Radio N-JOY is a Bulgarian radio station, launched in 2006. It is the main radio of BTV Media Group owned by Central European Media Enterprises, which is owned by WarnerMedia/AT&T (75%). It broadcasts music (new pop, rock and dance music), news, games and discussion to twenty-one towns and cities in Bulgaria, and is receivable across Europe via satellite.

Programs 
Monday - Friday:
7:00 to 10:00 a.m. Inspector N-JOY
7:00 to 10:00 a.m. Mrs. Thunder
10:00 to 14:00 a.m. Stan's show
14:00 to 18:00 Nice distracted by Desi
18:00 to 21:00 Party Time
Saturday:
12:00 to 15:00 a.m. N-JOY Top 40

References 

 

Radio stations in Bulgaria
Radio stations established in 2006